Sarah Adler (born 1978) is a French and Israeli actress with dual citizenship.

Career
Adler is now best known for her performances in the 2017 Israeli films Foxtrot and The Cakemaker; earlier in her career her notable films included Stones (2004), directed by her husband Raphael Nadjari; Our Music (2004), directed by Jean-Luc Godard; and Marie Antoinette (2006). Adler was nominated for European Film Award for Best Actress for her performance in Our Music, and Ophir Award for Best Actress for her performance in Jellyfish which won the Cannes Film Festivals' Caméra d'or.

In 2018, she won the Ophir Award for Best Actress for her role in The Cakemaker.

Filmography

Awards and nominations

References

External links 
 

French film actresses
French television actresses
21st-century French Jews
Israeli film actresses
Israeli television actresses
Jewish Israeli actresses
Living people
Actresses from Paris
20th-century French actresses
20th-century Israeli actresses
21st-century French actresses
21st-century Israeli actresses
1978 births